Claire Denis (born 21 April 1946) is a French filmmaker, screenwriter and occasional actress. Born in Paris, but raised in various parts of Africa, she made a career assisting other directors—primarily Costa-Gavras, Wim Wenders and Jim Jarmusch—before debuting with her own film, Chocolat, in 1988. She has since then made twelve feature films, three documentary films, in addition to several short films for anthology film series.

Known for their elliptical and sensual style, her films are often analysed in terms of tactility, corporeality and otherness. Several of her films, including Chocolat, are set in former French colonies in Africa, and examine the tension between native Africans and French authority figures.

Denis often works with the same actors and technicians, her artistic collaboration having been called "vital", "crucial", and a "keystone throughout her career". The director of photography Agnès Godard has shot almost every feature by Denis, and has said of the director that "[s]he has the faith and the belief that an association of ideas that's concise and that is based on pure cinematography — the choice of a frame, a focal point, the climate of the light — says something, and the idea that gluing those images together is going to create a sense." Denis often collaborates with Jean-Pol Fargeau on her scripts.

Her collaboration with Stuart Staples of the Tindersticks has been particularly noted. The band has on occasion performed live renditions of their songs from Denis' oeuvre, accompanied by screenings of film clips. These live performances have been analysed as examples of Paul Ricœur's theory of discourse as performance.

Key

Cast 

Frequent collaborators include Isaach de Bankolé, Grégoire Colin, Florence Loiret Caille, Katerina Golubeva, Nicolas Duvauchelle, Michel Subor, Béatrice Dalle, Nicole Dogué, Hélène Fillières, Alex Descas, Richard Courcet, Alice Houri, Juliette Binoche and Vincent Lindon.

Crew 

Denis frequently collaborates with Jean-Pol Fargeau (script), Nelly Quettier (editing), Agnès Godard (cinematography) and Stuart A. Staples (soundtrack).

References

Denis, Caire
Denis, Caire